MTV Unplugged (Live in Melbourne) is the first live album by Australian alternative band Gang of Youths. Gang of Youths were the first band to record a MTV Unplugged live in Australia in the new millennium.

The album includes nine tracks from their album Go Farther in Lightness and one from their EP Let Me Be Clear. Gang of Youths bassist Max Dunn said the performance was a "pretty important moment" for the group, explaining "it's a cool chance to do something a little different and stretch ourselves and give the fans a little more experience of the songs."

The recording took place at Cobblestone Pavilion, West Melbourne on 25 July 2018 and was broadcast on MTV Australia on 19 August 2018. The album was released on 26 October 2018.

Reception

Dylan Marshall from The AU Review wrote that "The recording has been delivered in two distinct parts: the opening five tracks are your real party tunes... the closing five tracks [are] the intimate, eat-away-at-your-heart type of tracks. It is this distinct differentiation in the release that makes the listening a little bit of a let down. By no means is their Unplugged performance disappointing; it just doesn't live up to the highs that I know the band are capable of in not only a studio setting, but also a full live show experience." Marshall added "As someone who has followed the band since their earliest days, I know what they can produce in a live setting. This Unplugged recording just may not be the best indicator of what the band truly have to showcase."

Stack Magazine said "Some bands make a concise effort to replicate their recorded songs live on stage, but there is an inescapably raw and sometimes tribal feeling that... is translated into this engrossing recording of the MTV event."

Track listing
All tracks are written by David Le'aupepe.

 "Let Me Down Easy" – 6:23
 "Fear and Trembling" – 7:15
 "Keep Me in the Open" – 5:27
 "The Deepest Sighs, the Frankest Shadows" – 7:30
 "The Heart Is a Muscle" – 6:23
 "Persevere" – 7:20
 "L'imaginaire" – 1:33
 "Do Not Let Your Spirit Wane" – 7:33
 "Go Farther in Lightness" – 2:33
 "Still Unbeaten Life" – 8:41

Personnel

Musicians
Gang of Youths
 David Le'aupepe – writing, vocals, guitar
 Joji Malani – lead guitar
 Max Dunn – bass
 Jung Kim – guitar, keyboards
 Donnie Borzestowski – drums

The Letter String Quartet
 Lizzy Welsh – violin
 Steph O'Hara – violin
 Biddy Connor – violin
 Judith Hamann – cello

Other musicians
 Charlie Woods – trumpet
 Ellie Lamb – trombone

Technical 
 Greg Wales – mixing
 Steve Smart – mastering

Promotional
 Kane Hibberd – photography
 Connor Bugelli – artwork, design

Charts

Release history

See also
 List of artists featured on MTV Unplugged

References

2018 live albums
Gang of Youths albums
Live albums by Australian artists
MTV Unplugged albums
Sony Music Australia albums